Dhobi Ghat or Mahalaxmi is an open air laundry place in Mumbai, India.

Dhobi Ghat, or variant spellings, may also refer to:

 Dhobi ghat, a general term in South and Southeast Asia for an open-air laundry-place or washing-place
 Dhobi Ghat (film), a 2010 Indian drama film
 Dhobi Ghat Park (Faisalabad), a park in Pakistan
 Dhoby Ghaut, a place in Singapore
 Dhoby Ghaut, a place in Penang
 Dhobaghat, or Udayapurkot, a village in Rapti Zone, Nepal

See also
 Dhobi, washermen in India
 Ghat (disambiguation)
 Laundry
 Lavoir
 Self-service laundry
 List of laundry topics